= Mullia Wali =

Mullia wali
- village
- Country: India
- State: Punjab

Government
  - Type: Panchayati raj (India)
  - Body: Gram panchayat

Languages
  - Official: Punjabi
- Time zone: UTC+5:30 (IST)

Mullia wali (Also named as Moolian Wali or Mullian Wali) is a village in the city of Fazika in Firozpur district in the state of Punjab, India.

The village is located on the road Malout to Fazilka and is about 23 km from Fazilka.

== People ==
The population of Mullia Wali is 2196 according to 2001 census.
